Baïpeung is a settlement in Senegal. In 2010 the population was assessed as 293.

References

External links
PEPAM

Populated places in the Bignona Department
Arrondissement of Sindian